Renee Dufault is an American research scientist. A former Food and Drug Administration researcher and whistleblower, who brought media attention to three separate studies that discovered mercury contained within high fructose corn syrup. After several years, Dufault and her independent research team were able to find a direct connection between inorganic mercury and glucose levels in the blood that showed dietary inorganic mercury exposure may be a risk factor in the development of diabetes.

Education
Dufault earned her Doctorate of Health Education (D.H.Ed.) degree from A.T. Still University in Missouri, and a B.S. in the Environmental Sciences from the University of California Davis (UCD).

Career
In the 1970s, Dufault enlisted in the U.S. Army as a medical laboratory technician. She then served in the Navy as an Industrial Hygiene Officer before transferring to the United States Public Health Service. While in the Public Health Service, she taught a training course at United Tribes Technical College as part of the Indian Country Environmental Hazard Assessment Project. She also developed a healthy diet tutorial for the Fort Peck Tribal Community College. The tutorial was used as an intervention tool for improving dietary behavior in tribal college students. It helped the students to reduce their intake of highly processed foods and increase their intake of whole foods while reducing their blood glucose and inorganic mercury levels.[Smithsonian]. Dufault has remained connected to various tribes throughout her career.

During her federal career, Dufault worked for the National Institutes of Health, the Environmental Protection Agency, Shoshone-Paiute Tribes and the Food and Drug Administration. She now works as an independent researcher and writer.

In 2004, Dufault began researching the mercury cycle on behalf of the FDA, which involved, among other things, analyzing a number of food products listing HFCS as either the first or second ingredient on the label. An EPA colleague inspired Dufault to follow up on this science because the caustic soda (lye) produced by the mercury cell chlorine industry likely contained mercury as a residue. During the course of her investigation, she found out that the biggest user of mercury cell chlorine products was the corn refining industry. In a confidential interview with a corn refiner, Dufault learned mercury cell caustic soda was used primarily by the corn refiners in their manufacturing process to lengthen the shelf life of corn syrups.   Dufault enlisted the help of several colleagues inside and outside government to test whether high fructose corn syrup or products containing high fructose corn syrup contained trace amounts of mercury.

While her research team initially tested only 20 samples, 45% of the samples contained trace amounts of mercury. Dufault then sent additional virgin samples of HFCS to two different laboratories, in order to independently confirm her results. Acting as third parties, the federal and academic laboratories tested and independently verified the presence of low levels of mercury in the HFCS samples and foods containing HFCS.

In October 2005, Dufault, and her extramural academic colleagues presented their preliminary findings to the FDA's Center for Food Safety and Applied Nutrition (CFSAN). At that time, Dufault was asked to halt the investigation. In  2006, Dufault attempted to publish the findings of her research on mercury levels contained within HFCS, but was denied the usage of the federal extramural data.

She quit her position in 2008, citing her intention to make her research public, and a belief that the FDA no longer supported her work.

Macroepigenetics 
Dufault also developed and published a scientific model to explain the side effects of HFCS consumption called “macroepigenetics”. This model describes the dietary factors that impact gene behavior in the human body to bring about conditions of autism or ADHD. This model can be used by researchers and physicians who want to guard against these chronic developmental disorders and improve health outcomes.

The model established a possible link between autism and certain environmental and dietary factors, including HFCS consumption, which has been shown to cause losses in zinc and calcium,  Such losses can impair a child's ability to flush toxic metals (such as Mercury) from his or her system, and impact the developing brain. Since the theory of "macroepigenetics" was originally introduced by Dufault, other researchers have found additional evidence to support the model.

Private sector 
Dufault founded the Food Ingredient and Health Research Institute, a non-profit that advocates for food ingredient safety, better food and nutrition education and research. Since leaving the FDA, Dufault has identified two separate ways that mercury can enter high fructose corn syrup and products containing high fructose corn syrup. She has also shown a link between mercury and chronic health conditions such as diabetes, autism and ADHD. In 2017, she argued that inorganic mercury may be one reason why autism impacts boys more often than girls. Dufault is currently looking at food labeling requirements in other countries that warn consumers about the food ingredients that contribute to the development of ADHD and autism.

Unsafe at Any Meal 
Unsafe At Any Meal: What the FDA Does Not Want You to Know About the Foods You Eat was published on May 1, 2017, by Square One Publication. The book is based on Dufault's independent research, conducted during her time with the FDA, and includes supporting studies conducted by others. She describes the process whereby various heavy metals, such as mercury and other toxic substances, can be found in trace amounts in many products commonly sold at the supermarket. She also discusses the FDA's refusal to act, provides advice on how to avoid these contaminants, and discusses the effectiveness of regulations designed to protect the public.

References

Year of birth missing (living people)
Living people
University of California, Davis alumni
University of Maryland Global Campus alumni
American medical researchers
Food and Drug Administration people
21st-century American women scientists